Here Waits Thy Doom is the fourth studio album from the Canadian heavy metal band 3 Inches of Blood. It is the first 3 Inches of Blood album not to feature vocalist Jamie Hooper and thus the first to feature no founding members of the band. This is also the first 3 Inches of Blood album released through Century Media. On June 29, 2009 members of the Goatriders Horde fan club were granted the first to listen to the new song "Call of the Hammer."  The song was available for streaming via the band's Myspace page starting July 8, 2009. On September 9 the band released a new music video for the track "Silent Killer".

Track listing

Personnel
3 Inches of Blood
 Cam Pipes – clean vocals
 Justin Hagberg – harsh vocals, guitars, bass, organ & piano, gang vocals on #05
 Shane Clark – guitars, bass, acoustic guitars, gang vocals on #05
 Ash Pearson - drums
Additional musicians
 Masa Anzai, Dan Rheault, James Farwell, Brad McKinnon: gang vocals on #05

References

2009 albums
3 Inches of Blood albums
Albums produced by Jack Endino
Century Media Records albums